Conference of Four Religions (Chữ Hán: 會同四敎) was an event of religious and philosophical discourse that took place in the Trinh kingdom of Tonkin (now northern Vietnam) during the rule of Trịnh Sâm (1767–1782). The single source to the events is from a 1864 book of the same name, which describes it as an important event in the introduction of Christianity to Vietnam.

Background
During Lord Trịnh Sâm's rule, there are two Dominican missionaries in Hanoi: Jacinta Castañeda, a Spaniard and Vicente Liem de la Paz, a native Vietnamese. The mother of the Lord's uncle, Lady Thượng Trâm is a devout Christian and she wishes his son to convert. Trịnh Sâm's uncle is still undecided, as the majority of royalties still follow Taoist and folk beliefs. As a result, he invites the two Christian missionaries, a Confucian priest, a Taoist priest and a Buddhist monk to the Lord's palace to debate on their religious views.

Three days debate 
The debate took place in three days, in which each representative will present and discuss on three different topics: 
First day debate:The origins of mankind, where do humans come from?
On this question, the Confucian official states that everything comes from Taiji, Taiji gives birth to Yin and Yang, these two in turn create the Five Elements that is the basis of everything. Which the missionaries ask "What is in the beginning that make Taiji move?"

The Taoist priest explains what is written in the Tao De Jing: "The Tao makes one, one makes two, two makes three and the three makes everything. The Tao itself is from nothing". Which the missionaries inquire "What is Tao? How can something be created from nothing?"

The Buddhist monk makes reference to the Heart Sutra and proclaims Buddha-hood as the source of life, which the Christian say if Buddha was born during the Zhou dynasty era, how could he had created the world.

The missionaries then tell the council how God created the world in six days, in 6,000 years ago. That everyone on Earth are descendants of Adam and Eve hence they are all brothers and sisters. To which the Confucian remarks that this is a merely a Western tradition, as no book from the East have mentioned about the Christian God.

Second day: What is the present human condition? How should we live our lives? 
The Confucian presents about Confucianism ethics and virtues. The missionaries and priests then debate on whether the Confucian Shangdi and the Abrahamic God is the same and only. The Daoist priest gives his views on the Wu wei philosophy, which the Christians criticize as passive and regressive. The Buddhist monk also discuss Buddhist ethics, to which the Christians question about punishment if these ethics were not met.

The Confucian then inquire about Christianity, claiming its also superstitious, citing the reverence of saints. He also questions the banning of idolatry and the worship of Jesus: "If Jesus saves everyone from sin, did he also save Shennong or Fuxi? Why did not God himself save the people, not forcing Jesus to die?". The Confucian also question the Nativity, and the problem of being both Christian and continuing worship one's ancestor.

The Buddhist monk then claims that Buddha and Jesus were both sons of the Jade Emperor, but Jesus was punished to Earth and had to suffer the Passion.

Third day: What is the meaning of life? What is the future of mankind? Is there an afterlife?

Aftermath

See also
Vicente Liem de la Paz
Christianity in Vietnam

References
Hội đồng Tứ giáo Daminh.vn 
Thư viện Bùi Chu 

Religion in Vietnam